SO2 may refer to:

In science:
 Sulfur dioxide (SO2), an oxide of sulfur, a chemical compound
to a Sulfonyl group (R-SO2-R)
 The special orthogonal group of degree 2
 oxygen saturation (SO2), in medicine of blood oxygenation
 S2 (star), aka SO-2, is the name of a star near the central black hole at the center of the Milky Way galaxy that takes 16 years to orbit that black hole.
 2015 SO2, an Aten asteroid in a horseshoe orbit co-orbital with Earth

It may also refer to:
 A staff officer of the second class, often a commissioned officer of lieutenant commander, major or squadron leader rank
 A London Metropolitan Police Specialist Operations command division
 Special Operations 2 – Operational, of SOE (Special Operations Executive, British, World War II)
 Star Ocean 2, a video game
 SO2 (album), a 2010 album by Shinichi Osawa
 An abbreviation of "Shout-out to"

See also

 
 
 Soso (disambiguation)
 Soo (disambiguation)
 SO (disambiguation)